Zinaida Lunina (Łacinka: Zinajida Iharaŭna Łunina; born 18 April 1989) is a Belarusian rhythmic gymnast. At the 2008 Summer Olympics in Beijing, she received a bronze medal in the group competition.

References

1989 births
Living people
Belarusian rhythmic gymnasts
Gymnasts at the 2008 Summer Olympics
Olympic gymnasts of Belarus
Olympic bronze medalists for Belarus
Olympic medalists in gymnastics
Medalists at the 2008 Summer Olympics
Gymnasts from Minsk
Medalists at the Rhythmic Gymnastics World Championships
Medalists at the Rhythmic Gymnastics European Championships